Stigmella montana is a moth of the family Nepticulidae. It is found in Kazakhstan and Tajikistan.

External links
Revised Check-List Of Mining Lepidoptera (Nepticuloidea, Tischerioidea And Gracillarioidea) From Central Asia

Nepticulidae
Moths of Asia
Moths described in 1991